Meredith is a Welsh Brittonic family name, and is also sometimes used as a girl's or boy's forename. The Welsh form is "Maredudd".

People
 Meredith (given name)
 Meredith (surname)

Places

Australia
 Meredith, Victoria

United States
 Meredith, Colorado
 Lake Meredith (Colorado)
 Meredith, Michigan
 Meredith, New Hampshire, a New England town
 Meredith (CDP), New Hampshire, the main village in the town
 Meredith, New York
 Meredith Township, Cloud County, Kansas 
 Meredith Township, Wake County, North Carolina
 Lake Meredith, reservoir formed by a dam on the Canadian River at Sanford, Texas

Ships
 HMS Meredith (1763), sloop of the British Royal Navy purchased in 1763 and sold in 1784
 USCS Meredith, survey ship in United States Coast Survey service from 1851 to 1872
 USS Meredith, the name of more than one United States Navy ship
 SS Meredith Victory, United States Merchant Marine Victory ship

Other
 Meredith College, women's liberal arts college located in Raleigh, North Carolina
 Dotdash Meredith, which publishes Better Homes and Gardens in the U.S.
 Meredith Music Festival near Meredith, Victoria, Australia
 Meredith v. Jefferson County Board of Education, a 2007 United States Supreme Court decision striking down a racial desegregation plan in Jefferson County, Kentucky